Owasco is an unincorporated community in Kimball County, Nebraska, United States.

History
Owasco was a station on the Union Pacific Railroad. It was named after the Circle Arrow Ranch company nearby, with the O symbolizing the "Circle".

References

Unincorporated communities in Kimball County, Nebraska
Unincorporated communities in Nebraska